The 1939–40 season was Real Madrid Club de Fútbol's 37th season in existence and the club's 8th consecutive season in the top flight of Spanish football. The club also played in the last edition of the Campeonato Regional del Centro (Regional Championship of the Center) and the Copa del Generalísimo (Generalissimo's Cup).

Summary
After three seasons with no league football due to the Spanish Civil War, the Board appointed Paco Bru from Girona FC as head coach. Madrid finished fourth in the league, with Athletic Aviación winning the title. Striker Sabino Barinaga played just two matches due to an injury. Still, offensively the team played in superb fashion, with Manuel Alday scoring 17 league goals. However, the defensive line was one of the worst in the championship, sinking Madrid's chances for a title.

Meanwhile, in the Copa del Generalísimo the squad reached the final, where they were defeated by Español after extra time.

Squad

Transfers

Competitions

Campeonato Regional del Centro

Position by round

League table

Matches

La Liga

Position by round

League table

Matches

Copa del Generalísimo

Final

Statistics

Squad statistics

Players statistics

Notes

References

Real Madrid CF seasons
Real Madrid CF